The 1989  Georgia Bulldogs football team represented the University of Georgia during the 1989 NCAA Division I-A football season. The Bulldogs completed the season with a 6–6 record.

Schedule

Team players drafted into the NFL
The following players were drafted into professional football following the season.

References

Georgia
Georgia Bulldogs football seasons
Georgia Bulldogs football